The Silverado Trail is a scenic route that travels 29 miles along the Eastern edge of the Napa Valley, parallel to and several miles to the east of California State Route 29.

History
The road began as a trail built in 1852 after flooding made the main Napa Valley road impassable.  Later, it served as a wagon trail to link cinnabar mines on Mount St. Helena to San Pablo Bay, the northern portion of the San Francisco Bay, and was the first permanent road from Napa to Calistoga.

Silver was discovered in Napa Valley in 1858, and wine production began in the 1870s, making the road an important trade route.  Charles Bolles, a highway bandit also known as "Black Bart", preyed on the road's travelers in the 1880s.  Safety improved when motorized bus service began in 1910.  A Phylloxera plague and Prohibition forced most but not all of the local wineries out of business.

The area thrived with the growing prominence of California wine.  One of the wineries on the road, Stag's Leap Wine Cellars, made Napa Valley world-famous in 1976 when it won the Judgment of Paris, a promotional wine competition among French and California wines.  Today, at least 40 of the Valley's more than 200 wineries are along or near the road. Each year in March, the route also plays host to the annual Napa Valley Marathon.

Major intersections

External links
silveradotrail.com - Silverado Trail Association (industry site)
Map - from Silverado Trail Association

References

Transportation in Napa County, California
St. Helena, California
1852 establishments in California